Sigillictystis insigillata is a species of moth of the family Geometridae. It is found in Australia, including Tasmania. This species has also been introduced to New Zealand.

References

Moths described in 1862
Eupitheciini
Moths of Australia